Glutamate decarboxylase 1 (brain, 67kDa) (GAD67), also known as GAD1, is a human gene.

This gene encodes one of several forms of glutamic acid decarboxylase, identified as a major autoantigen in insulin-dependent diabetes. The enzyme encoded is responsible for catalyzing the production of gamma-aminobutyric acid from L-glutamic acid. A pathogenic role for this enzyme has been identified in the human pancreas since it has been identified as an autoantigen and an autoreactive T cell target in insulin-dependent diabetes. This gene may also play a role in the stiff man syndrome. Deficiency in this enzyme has been shown to lead to pyridoxine dependency with seizures. Alternative splicing of this gene results in two products, the predominant 67-kD form and a less-frequent 25-kD form.

Interactions 

GAD1 has been shown to interact with GAD2.

See also 
 Glutamate decarboxylase

References

Further reading